Borowski (feminine: Borowska; plural: Borowscy) is a surname of Polish-language origin.

People 
Dorota Borowska (born 1996), Polish canoeist
Edmund Borowski (born 1945), Polish athlete
Elie Borowski (1913–2003), Jewish art dealer and collector, founder of the Bible Lands Museum
Felix Borowski (1872–1956), American composer
Henryk Borowski (1910–1991), Polish actor
Izydor Borowski (–1838), Polish-Iranian general
Joe Borowski (1933–1996), Canadian politician
Joe Borowski (born 1971), sports broadcaster for the Arizona Diamondbacks
John Borowski, American filmmaker
Jörn Borowski (born 1959), German sailor
Marek Borowski (born 1946), Polish politician
Paul Borowski (1937–2012), German sailor
Tadeusz Borowski (1922–1951), Polish writer
Tim Borowski (born 1980), German footballer
Wacław Borowski (1885–1954), Polish painter
Mae Borowski (born 1997), main character of Night in the Woods

See also
 
 
Borowski v Canada (AG)
Minister of Justice v. Borowski
Irvin J. Borowsky (born 1924), American publisher and philanthropist
Borovsky (disambiguation)

Polish-language surnames